Meshulam may refer to:

Meshulam Dovid Soloveitchik (known as Reb or Rav Dovid, born 1921), Orthodox rabbi and rosh yeshiva
Meshulam Gross or Grosz (1863–1947), businessman, inventor and learned layman, author of two sefarim of Torah novellae
Meshulam Nahari (born 1951), rabbi, Israeli politician
Meshulam Riklis (1923–2019), Israeli businessman
Uzi Meshulam (1952–2013), rabbi from Yehud, leader of a radical group of Yemenite Jews